The 1990 All-Ireland Under-21 Hurling Championship final was a hurling match that was played at O'Moore Park, Portlaoise on 9 September 1990 to determine the winners of the 1990 All-Ireland Under-21 Hurling Championship, the 27th season of the All-Ireland Under-21 Hurling Championship, a tournament organised by the Gaelic Athletic Association for the champion teams of the four provinces of Ireland. The final was contested by Kilkenny of Leinster and Tipperary of Munster, with Kilkenny winning by 2-11 to 1-11.

Match

Details

References

1990 in hurling
All-Ireland Under-21 Hurling Championship Finals
Kilkenny GAA matches
Tipperary GAA matches